Saimone Taumoepeau (born 21 December 1979 in Ha'apai, Tonga) is a professional rugby union player in France. He is the younger brother of Tevita Taumoepeau.

Career
Born in Tonga, Taumoepeau emigrated to New Zealand in 1997. Taumoepeau was a shock selection in the 2004 end-of-year All Blacks squad after having only made his debut that season in provincial rugby's Air New Zealand Cup and having yet to play Super Rugby.  He first made his name as a loosehead prop, but made his debut as a hooker for the Junior All Blacks. He played his rugby for Auckland at provincial level and the Blues at Super 14 level before moving to French club Toulon.

While considered to be on the smaller side of the scale compared to most international props in terms of physical size, Taumoepeau has made a reputation for being a devastating scrummager via technique and brute strength. He also proved to be a reliable hooker for both Auckland, the Blues and at Junior All Blacks level.

Taumoepeau signed with Toulon in 2007, having joined them after that year's New Zealand season and won the French Pro D2 Championship 2007–2008. He played for Castres Olympique between 2011 and 2016, and won the French top 14 Championship in 2012–13.

Honours

Club 
 Castres
Top 14: 2012–13

References

External links

1979 births
Living people
People from Haʻapai
Tongan emigrants to New Zealand
Rugby union props
Tongan rugby union players
New Zealand rugby union players
New Zealand international rugby union players
Expatriate rugby union players in France
Blues (Super Rugby) players
Auckland rugby union players
RC Toulonnais players
Castres Olympique players
Tongan expatriate rugby union players
New Zealand expatriate rugby union players
New Zealand expatriate sportspeople in France
Tongan expatriate sportspeople in France